Kohon or Cohon may refer to:

David José Kohon
George Cohon (born 1937), Canadian businessman
Mark Cohon (born 1966), Canadian Football League's 12th Commissioner
Jared Cohon (born 1947), eighth President of Carnegie Mellon University

See also 
 Cohen (disambiguation)
 Cohons, a commune in the Haute-Marne department in northeastern France
 Cajón, a box-shaped percussion instrument

Kohenitic surnames